The  also known as ACE was one of the largest anime trade fairs in the world, held annually in Japan. The first event was held in 2012. The event was held at Makuhari Messe, a convention and exhibition center in Tokyo Bay, in late March. In 2014 it was merged with the Tokyo International Anime Fair to form AnimeJapan.

Event history

References

External links
official site (Japanese)

2012 establishments in Japan
2013 disestablishments in Japan
Defunct anime conventions
Annual events in Japan
Recurring events established in 2012
Recurring events disestablished in 2013
Tourist attractions in Chiba Prefecture